Valeriu Pantazi (born Pantazie Valeriu Constantinescu on May 17, 1940–July 25, 2015) was a Romanian poet, writer, and painter.

He was born in Urechești, Vrancea County. He was a close associate of Nichita Stănescu, and the painter . His great friend was the painter  from Pitești. 

He died in Bucharest and is buried at Străulești Cemetery.

Images

Bibliography 

 Constantin Toni Dârțu - Personalități române și faptele lor, 1950 - 2010, volumul 56 (volum de colecție), Editura Studis, Iași, 2013, pp. 442 - 459, 
 Eugen Barbu - O istorie polemică și antologică a literaturii române, Editura Eminescu, București, 1976.
Mass-media:
 The weekly culture of the Writers' Union of Romania - Luceafărul de dimineață, No.44, December 23, 2009
 The Naţiunea independent weekly, No. 246, April 20, 2004
 The newspaper Dimineaţa No. 3888, August 12, 2004

1940 births
2015 deaths
People from Vrancea County
Romanian painters
University of Bucharest alumni